Downsview was a provincial riding in Ontario, Canada.  It was created for the 1963 provincial election, and was retained until redistribution in 1999.  Downsview was located in North York, which was previously part of Metropolitan Toronto and is now part of the City of Toronto. It was formed from part of the original riding of York Centre. In 1996 it was merged into a newly reconstituted riding of the same name.

For most of its history, Downsview was a hotly contested marginal seat between the Liberals and the New Democratic Party.  Its final representative, however, was a Progressive Conservative: Annamarie Castrilli was elected as a Liberal in 1995, but crossed parties on the last sitting day of the legislature before the 1999 election.

The riding's demographics and boundaries shifted throughout its existence.  In the 1960s, it consisted of the area of the borough of North York between Bathurst Street and Keele Street.  During this period, the riding had a large Jewish community, representing about 40% of the population.  In the 1975 election, the eastern, predominantly Jewish section of the riding was redistributed to the riding of Wilson Heights and the riding became predominantly Italian.  Odoardo Di Santo, elected as a New Democrat in 1975, was one of the first three Italian-Canadians to serve in the Ontario legislature.

Members of Provincial Parliament

Electoral results

References

Notes

Citations

Former provincial electoral districts of Ontario
Provincial electoral districts of Toronto